State Highway 22 (SH 22) is a  state highway in the U.S. state of Texas that travels from Corsicana to Hamilton in the north central part of the state.

History

SH 22 was one of the 25 original state highways proposed on June 21, 1917, along a path from Wichita Falls to Comanche. On August 18, 1917, plans had been extended from Comanche eastward to Hillsboro. On September 10, 1917, plans had been extended from Hillsboro eastward to Nacogdoches. On March 17, 1919, SH 22 was extended to Logansport. Construction was slow, and on August 21, 1923, most of the section from Wichita Falls to Comanche had been reassigned to SH 79 and SH 67, while SH 22 ran from De Leon to Corsicana. The Section from Corsicana to Palestine was cancelled, the section from Palestine to Rusk was transferred to SH 43A, the section from Rusk to Nacogdoches was cancelled, and the section from Nacogdoches to Logansport was transferred to the SH 76. On March 19, 1930, SH 22 was extended east to Timpson over SH 139, SH 43A, and SH 26B. The section from Comanche to De Leon was transferred to SH 81. On December 8, 1932, the section from Comanche to Hamilton was transferred to SH 36. On August 1, 1936, three routes called SH 22 Spur were designated to Blooming Grove, Frost, and Barry (which were taken over on March 21, 1938). On November 24, 1937, two more routes called SH 22 Spur to Brandon and Mertens were designated (which were taken over on May 23, 1938). On September 26, 1939, the part from Corsicana to Palestine had been transferred to US 287 and the part from Palestine to Timpson had been transferred to US 84, while SH 22 ran from Hamilton to Corsicana, and remained on this routing to this day. The five SH 22 Spur routes were renumbered Spur 30, Spur 31, Spur 32, Spur 55, and Spur 56.

Major intersections

See also

 List of state highways in Texas
 List of highways numbered 22

References

External links

022
Transportation in Hamilton County, Texas
Transportation in Hill County, Texas
Transportation in Bosque County, Texas
Transportation in Navarro County, Texas